Italian Osteria Scene, Girl welcoming a Person entering is an 1847 oil on canvas painting by Wilhelm Marstrand, now in the collection of the Ny Carlsberg Glyptotek in Copenhagen. The painting served as inspiration for Carl Bloch's In a Roman Osteria (1866, Danish National Gallery).

History
Marstrand arrived in Rome in 1836 and stayed until 1840. In 184549. he returned to Italy. He painted the Italian osteria scene in 1847. It was acquired by Jacob Scavenius. On 14 December 1894, it was sold as part of an auction of Scavenius' estate. The buyer was Carl Jacobsen and the painting was subsequently included in the collection of the Ny Carlsberg Glyptotek.

Description
The painting depicts two young Italian women and their sleeping chaperone mother seated at a table in an osteria. One of the girls is raising her glass and making eye contact to welcome another person entering the restaurant. Her sister has her back turned at the viewer but is looking across her left shoulder to see who is entering and is also making eye contact with the viewer.

Related works
Carl Bloch's In a Roman Osteria was painted with direct inspiration from Marstrand's painting. Moritz G. Melchior, who had commissioned the work, had specifically requested a painting similar to that of Marstrand's Italian osteria scene. Elisabeth Jerichau-Baumann has also painted an osteria scene with inspiration from that of Marstrand's painting.

See also
 Church-Goers Arriving by Boat at the Parish Church of Leksand on Siljan Lake

References

External links
 Italian Osteria Scene at kulturarv.dk
 Source

1847 paintings
Paintings by Wilhelm Marstrand
Paintings in the collection of the Ny Carlsberg Glyptotek